Teletoon at Night (stylized as TELEToON AT NiGHT and formerly known as Teletoon's Adult Block, The Detour On Teletoon and Teletoon Detour) was a Canadian English language late night programming block that aired on Teletoon, which is owned by Teletoon Canada, Inc. (a subsidiary of Corus Entertainment). The block featured programming for both teen and adult audiences.

It was similar in format to Adult Swim, a late-night programming block that aired on Cartoon Network, from which the block acquired most of its programming. The block's French counterpart, Télétoon la nuit, airs on Teletoon's French-language channel, Télétoon.

History

Prior to the launch of The Detour on Teletoon and Teletoon Unleashed, Teletoon had aired a lineup of adult-targeted programming (which were mixed alongside animated series aimed at teenagers) during the nighttime hours since it was launched on October 17, 1997. Teletoon at Night's roots lie in 2 former programming blocks that aired on Teletoon: the teenage-oriented block formally known as "The Detour", and the adult-oriented "Teletoon Unleashed" block, which had been dropped due to lack of new content (90% of the series had only a single season with 13 episodes, which would get re-run frequently). Teletoon Unleashed was also known for airing every program with an 18+ content rating, so as to attract an adult audience, regardless of whether the program contained adults-only content or not. In September 2004, the two blocks were amalgamated, with all-new branding created by Guru Studio. For the start of the 2006-2007 season, a new Friday night companion block, F-Night, debuted, featuring a slightly different lineup, mainly comedy series from Adult Swim (such as Tom Goes to the Mayor and Squidbillies).

With the launch of the Canadian version of Adult Swim (via the Canadian version of Cartoon Network) on July 4, 2012, most of the original programming from the American service migrated to its Canadian counterpart.

In the summer of 2014, films on Saturdays were branded as the "Saturday Night Funhouse Double Feature". Meanwhile, Teletoon acquired broadcast rights to The Awesomes, a Hulu original series. In October 2014, Bento Box Entertainment, the studio that produces The Awesomes, announced they would be producing a new slate of shows for Teletoon at Night. In the same month, Blue Ant Media, Mondo Media, and Corus announced that Teletoon at Night would air a new series featuring shorts from Bite on Mondo, a program in which content creators pitched ideas for several new TV series. It was later revealed on Adult Swim's Facebook page that the new series, dubbed Night Sweats, would air on Adult Swim instead.

During the week of September 1, 2015, it was announced on air that, on that date, several of the block's shows would move to Adult Swim. In a press release posted on September 3, 2015, it was announced that the block would now air Mondays through Thursdays starting at 10:00 p.m, with a film at 11:00 p.m. Teletoon's Superfan Friday block expanded in Teletoon at Night's place. It was later announced in December 2015 that, starting on January 4, 2016, Teletoon at Night would be adding more films to their schedule and their remaining shows moved over to Adult Swim.

In February 2016, several TV series that were airing on Adult Swim began airing on Teletoon at Night. On February 24, 2016, it was announced in a press release that the seventh season of Archer would air on both blocks. In the same month, Teletoon at Night's website revealed that its Fred at Night segment would be discontinued after six years, with the final installment airing on February 25, 2016. On March 23, 2016, it was revealed that Archer's seventh season would instead air on Teletoon at Night, although the season premiere did air in simulcast on Adult Swim. 

On March 4, 2019, along with the announcement that Action would be replaced with a full-time Adult Swim channel on April 1, 2019, it was also announced that Teletoon at Night would be discontinued. The block aired for the final time in April 1, 2019 at 3:00 a.m..

Programming

Original series

Acquired series 

G = Intended for a broad, general audience. While not necessarily designed for children, any elements aimed at older viewers will be very occasional and mindfully discreet so as to be appropriate viewing for the whole family.

C8 = Intended for older children, 8 years and above. Contains low intensity violence or thematic elements that are more suitable for viewers who can distinguish between fiction and reality.

PG = Parental discretion/co-viewing recommended for viewers under 13. Designed for a general audience, but ultimately geared towards the older viewers in that spectrum. Contains one or more of the following: Moderate mature themes, moderate language, moderate violence, moderate sexual content/nudity.

14+ = Not intended for viewers under 14. Designed specifically for viewers who have developed the psychological perspective needed to comprehend/process more impactful programs. Contains one or more of the following: Intense mature themes, strong language, intense violence, more overt sexual content/nudity.

18+ = Intended for adult viewing only. Contains one or more of the following: explicit themes, hyper-realistic violence, graphic language or explicit sexual content/nudity.

References

Night
Television programming blocks in Canada
Canadian late-night television programming
1997 establishments in Canada
2019 disestablishments in Canada
1997 Canadian television series debuts
2019 Canadian television series endings
Television channels and stations established in 1997
Television channels and stations disestablished in 2019
Former Corus Entertainment subsidiaries